Yasarat (also Romanized as Yasārāt; also known as Yassāra) is a village in Miyan Ab-e Shomali Rural District, in the Central District of Shushtar County, Khuzestan Province, Iran. At the 2006 census, its population was 107, in 21 families.

References 

Populated places in Shushtar County